Nicolás "Nico" Federico López Alonso (born 1 October 1993), also known as "El Diente," is a Uruguayan professional footballer who plays as a forward for Liga MX club Tigres UANL.

Club career

Early career
Nicknamed "El Conejo" (The Rabbit) or "El Diente" (The Tooth), López started his playing career with Montevideo Wanderers, but was originally rejected after he was deemed not to be physically strong enough to play professionally. He successively joined the Nacional youth academy, where he turned into a very prolific striker and, more occasionally, left winger.

On 24 April 2011, after being born as part of the first team under head coach Juan Ramón Carrasco, López made his debut at the age of 17 in a league game against Central Español, promptly scoring also his first senior goal. In August 2011, he was involved in a feud with Nacional, after his father revealed the player was in Italy in order to hold talks with a number of unspecified Serie A sides, leading his Uruguayan club and the national federation to consider potential actions to the FIFA against the player.

López ended his Nacional career with 3 goals in 6 games in all competitions.

Roma
López was acquired by Roma in the January 2012 transfer window, and then included in the Primavera under-19 squad for the rest of the season, scoring 15 times in 12 youth games.

López was taken into consideration as a first team player by new head coach Zdeněk Zeman, who included him in the senior roster for the pre-season camp and then featured him in a number of friendly games. López made his first team debut on 26 August 2012, replacing captain Francesco Totti in the final minutes of the first game of the Serie A season, a home match versus Catania, and promptly scored an injury time equaliser (the game ended 2–2). He also started the round of 16 cup match against Atalanta. Lopez played 7 times, scoring once in his first season in the Roma first team.

Udinese
On 13 July 2013, he joined Udinese with Valerio Verre.

Internacional
On 19 July 2016, Brazilian club Internacional announced that signed with Nico López. Colorado paid €4 million for 50% of Uruguayan footballer's rights.

Tigres UANL
In December 2019, López was transferred to Tigres UANL, the Mexican club paid a $10 million fee. He was the top goalscorer of the Liga MX's Apertura 2021 season.

International career
López has represented Uruguay at Under-20 level, scoring 10 goals in his 16 caps. He played at the 2013 FIFA U-20 World Cup, earning the Silver Ball award after scoring four goals.

On 21 October 2022, López was named in Uruguay's 55-man preliminary squad for the 2022 FIFA World Cup.

Career statistics

Club

Honours

Nacional
 Uruguayan Primera División: 2010–11

UANL
 CONCACAF Champions League: 2020

Individual
 Liga MX Best XI: Apertura 2021
 Liga MX Golden Boot (Shared): Apertura 2021

References

External links

1993 births
Living people
Footballers from Montevideo
Uruguayan footballers
Association football forwards
Uruguayan Primera División players
Campeonato Brasileiro Série A players
Campeonato Brasileiro Série B players
Liga MX players
Club Nacional de Football players
Sport Club Internacional players
Tigres UANL footballers
Serie A players
A.S. Roma players
Udinese Calcio players
Hellas Verona F.C. players
La Liga players
Granada CF footballers
Uruguay under-20 international footballers
Uruguayan expatriate footballers
Uruguayan expatriate sportspeople in Italy
Expatriate footballers in Italy
Uruguayan expatriate sportspeople in Spain
Expatriate footballers in Spain
Expatriate footballers in Brazil
Uruguayan expatriate sportspeople in Brazil